Al-Habash was an ancient region in the Horn of Africa situated in the northern highlands of modern-day Ethiopia and Eritrea.

Origin
The term derives from Semitic languages: Ge'ez: Ḥabäśät, first written in the vowelless Ge'ez Abjad as ሐበሠተ, romanized: ḤBŚT; Sabaean: ḤBS²T, Arabic: حبشة‎, romanized: ḥabaša. One of the earliest known local uses of the term dates to the second or third century Sabaean inscription recounting the nəgus ("king") GDRT of Aksum and ḤBŠT. The Ezana Stone also has an early mention of HBŚT. The early Semitic term appears to refer to a group of peoples, rather than a specific ethnicity. The Al-Habash were known in Islamic literature as being rulers of a Christian kingdom, guaranteeing its a historical exonym for the Axumites of antiquity. In the modern day, variations of the term are used in Turkey, Iran, and the Arab World in reference to Ethiopia and as a pan-ethnic word in the west by the Amhara, Tigray, and Biher-Tigrinya of Eritrea and Ethiopia (see: Habesha peoples.) The Turks created the province of Habesh when the Ottoman Empire conquered parts of the coastline of present-day Eritrea starting in 1557. During this, Özdemir Pasha took the port city of Massawa and the adjacent city of Arqiqo. Along with the neighboring Barbaroi (Berbers) of Barbara, the Habash are recorded in the 1st century Greek travelogue the Periplus of the Erythraean Sea as engaging in extensive commercial trade with Egypt, among other areas. The document also relates a strong connection with the "Frankincense Country" in the Mahra region of modern Yemen and a symbiotic relationship with the ancient Sabaeans, with whom the Habash were allied.

Etymology
Due to the ancient nature of the term, the etymology and meaning of Al-Habash are unknown, but some scholars have defined it as being in reference to a fertile region "plenty in olives." Francis Breyer believes the Egyptian demonym to be the source of the Semitic term.

See also
Ethiopian Empire
Horn of Africa

References

Historical regions
Horn of Africa